Christian Müller may refer to:

 Christian Müller (footballer, born 1938), German footballer
 Christian Müller (footballer, born 1960), German footballer
 Christian Müller (cyclist) (born 1982), German cyclist
 Christian Müller (footballer, born 1983), German footballer
 Christian Müller (footballer, born 1984), German footballer
 Christian Müller (organ builder), Dutch organ builder
 Christian Müller (psychiatrist) (1921–2013), Swiss teacher, psychiatrist, psychoanalyst and writer
 Christian Philipp Müller (born 1957), Swiss artist
Christian Müller (historian), German historian and sinologist.

See also 
 Christian Møller (1904–1980), Danish chemist and physicist